Richard Dale Pursel (born 17 September 1964) is an American television writer, screenwriter, story, and storyboard artist. He is known as a writer for the television series The Ren & Stimpy Show, SpongeBob SquarePants, and Cow and Chicken.

Filmography

Writer
1992–1993: The Ren & Stimpy Show - 4 episodes
1993: 2 Stupid Dogs - 5 episodes
1997: I Am Weasel - 4 episodes
1999: Weekend Pussy Hunt 
1999: The New Woody Woodpecker Show - 4 episodes
2000: Poochini's Yard
2001–2002: The Ripping Friends - 13 episodes
2003: Ren & Stimpy "Adult Party Cartoon" - 8 episodes
2005: Robotboy - 5 episodes
2006: Tom and Jerry Tales - 14 episodes
2007–2012, 2016–2017, 2021: SpongeBob SquarePants - Staff Writer
2009: The Mighty B! - 1 episode
2011: The Super Hero Squad Show - 1 episode
2012–2014: Ben 10: Omniverse - 2 episodes
2014: Mickey Mouse - 2 episodes
2015: Wabbit - 2 episodes
2016: Home: Adventures with Tip & Oh - 2 episodes

Screenwriter
2015: Selección Canina
2016: El Americano: The Movie

Story
1992–1993; 1995: The Ren & Stimpy Show - 11 episodes
1997: The Goddamn George Liquor Program 1 episodes
1997: I Am Weasel - 13 episodes
1997–1998: Cow and Chicken - 7 episodes
1999: The New Woody Woodpecker Show - 1 episodes
2003: Ren & Stimpy "Adult Party Cartoon" - 4 episodes
2006: Tom and Jerry Tales - 4 episodes
2016: Home: Adventures with Tip & Oh - 2 episodes
2016–2019: Mighty Magiswords - 47 episodes
2020–2021: The Mighty Ones - 2 episodes

Storyboard artist
1992: The Ren & Stimpy Show - 1 episode
1997: I Am Weasel - 1 episode
2003: Ren & Stimpy "Adult Party Cartoon" - 1 episode

Bibliography

References

External links

American television writers
American male television writers
Living people
1964 births
People from Lincoln, Nebraska
American storyboard artists